A Gripple  wire joiner is a device used to join and tension wire, to terminate and suspend wires and wire ropes, and also to support false ceilings, cable baskets, and similar items. They are manufactured in Sheffield, England by Gripple Ltd. The name derives from the fact the device both "grips" and "pulls" wire.

History
Wire salesman Hugh Facey invented the original "Gripple" wire tensioner and joiner after a conversation in 1986 with a Welsh farmer. The first Gripple wire joiner was launched in the UK in 1988, and Gripple Ltd was established in 1991.

Description
Wire or wire rope is inserted into a channel in the Gripple wire joiner, where it is gripped by a spring-loaded roller or wedge, and tensioned by being pulled through. The channel is mirrored on the opposite side of the Gripple wire joiner, allowing a second piece of wire to be joined.

By orienting the channel of a gripple wire joiner vertically and using it with wire rope, it makes a convenient suspension system capable of holding up substantial loads, and this has given rise to a range of Gripple suspension systems, which are sold to the construction industry worldwide.

Thousands of Gripple wire joiners hold together the Great Dingo Fence in Australia, the world's longest fence. The company produces over 30 million Gripple wire joiners per year.

These are also used extensively in the sport of orienteering as a form of security for the controls, particularly in urban environments.

Images

See also 
List of companies in Sheffield

Notes

References

External links
Official company website

Manufacturing companies of the United Kingdom
Wire
Fasteners
Fences
Companies based in Sheffield
English inventions
Companies established in 1988